The Croatian Franciscan Province of Saints Cyril and Methodius is a province of the Franciscan Order of the Catholic Church based in Zagreb which is active in Croatia and Serbia (including Vojvodina province and the City of Belgrade). 

The province was formed in 1900, and has monasteries throughout northern Croatia, as well as in Subotica, Bač, Novi Sad and Zemun, Serbia. The province runs its seminary in Zagreb.

The province also has its own publication, Fraternitas.

External links 
Croatian Franciscan Province of Saints Cyril and Methodius

Catholic Church in Croatia
Catholic Church in Vojvodina
Saints Cyril and Methodius